Shibi Khagan (r. 609 or 611–619 AD) succeeded Yami Qaghan as the second khagan of the Eastern Turkic Khaganate.

Reign 
He succeeded Yami Qaghan in 609 or 611. From 613 to 615 he was actively supporting agrarian rebels inside China.

Pei Ju had become apprehensive that khagan was becoming strong and difficult to control and had therefore suggested that Emperor Yang offer to marry a princess to the khan's brother Ashina Chiji (阿史那叱吉). Chiji shad, in fear, declined.  This already brought resentment from the khagan, when Pei tricked the Shibi Khan's strategist Shishuhu (史蜀胡) into meeting him at Mayi (present-day Shuozhou, Shanxi) and then killed him, claiming that Shishuhu was planning to rebel against the khagan. Shibi Khahan, knowing that the accusation was false, became resolved to rebel against Sui.

In the fall of 615, when Emperor Yang was visiting Yanmen Commandery on the northern frontier, the khagan launched a surprise attack on the area, overrunning most of its Chinese settlements. Warned by the khagan's wife Princess Yicheng — a member of the imperial family who had been well treated by Empress Xiao during an earlier visit — the emperor, empress, and their entourage escaped to the commandery seat at present-day Daixian. The Turks besieged them there on September 11. Resources in seat was small. Emperor was reported to cry out of fear seeing  Yuwen suggested Emperor Yang select a few thousand elite cavalry soldiers to attempt a break out, but Su Wei and Fan Zigai (樊子蓋) persuaded Emperor Yang not to attempt this. Emperor Yang put Xiao Yu and Pei Ju in charge of planning the military counteroffensive, but was only able to get the siege lifted after he followed the advice of the empress's brother Xiao Yu and sent messengers to Princess Yicheng, who was directing military affairs at the Turkic capital in her husband's absence. She falsely informed Shibi Khagan that the Turks were under attack from the north, and so the khagan lifted the siege.

During the turmoil of the later years of Yangdi's reign, he supported various local warlords in northwestern China, who claimed the title of emperor, including Li Yuan, who would go on to found the Tang Dynasty. The khagan supplied Li with 2,000 horses and 500 cavalry, who played a crucial role in the early victories of the Tang such as the Battle of Huoyi.

Shibi khagan later supported Liang Shidu and created him firstly as Tardu Bilge khagan (大度毗伽可汗) and bestowed on him a flag with a wolf head, the symbol of the Tujue. Liang guided Shibi's forces to occupy the Ordos Desert region. Subsequently, Shibi created him Jieshi Tianzi (解事天子, i.e., "the Tianzi who solved issues") for Liang, although he himself declared a state of Liang and himself its emperor. His ally Guo Zihe was also created Wuli shad.

He also supported Liu Wuzhou, who gathered about 10,000 soldiers and declared himself commandery governor. When officials of the nearby Yanmen Commandery (roughly modern Xinzhou, Shanxi), Chen Xiaoyi (陳孝意) and Wang Zhibian (王智辯) attacked him, he struck back in conjunction with Eastern Tujue, killing Wang and forcing Chen to flee.  He then captured Loufan Commandery (樓煩郡, part of modern Xinzhou) and pillaged Fenyang Palace (汾陽宮)—one of the numerous subsidiary palaces that Emperor Yang built around the empire—and took the ladies in waiting and gave them to khagan as a tribute; in return, khagan sent him horses. Liu then also captured Dingxiang Commandery (定襄郡, roughly modern Hohhot, Inner Mongolia). Shibi then created him "Dingyang Khagan"—i.e., "the Khagan who rules over Yang." Khagan also bestowed on Liu a great banner with a symbol of a wolf's head.

Another rebel, Li Yuan declared rebellion in fall 617, and Liu Wenjing suggested that he, who was still ostensibly claiming to be loyal to Sui but wanting to support Emperor Yang's grandson Yang You the Prince of Dai, then at Chang'an, as emperor, should change his banners from the regular Sui banners to distance himself from Emperor Yang, while seeking an alliance with Eastern Tujue for support.  Li Yuan agreed, and sent Liu to Eastern Tujue to meet with the Shibi Khan. When khagan asked him what Li Yuan's intention was, Liu responded:

 The emperor [i.e., Emperor Yang's father Emperor Wen] deposed his proper heir [i.e., Emperor Yang's older brother Yang Yong] and gave the throne to this current emperor, and this led to the current troubles. The Duke of Tang is an honored relative of the imperial clan, and he did not dare to sit by watching for the state to fail, and therefore he rose in righteousness, wanting to depose the improper emperor.  He is willing to enter the capital with the soldiers of you, Great Khagan.  If you do so, the people and the land will belong to the Duke of Tang, but the money, silk, gold, and treasures will be yours, Great Khagan.Shibi was pleased, and while he was not wholeheartedly willing to support Li Yuan, he nevertheless sent his general Kangqiaoli (康鞘利) Tegin with 2,000 men to accompany Liu back south, as Li Yuan had already marched south toward Chang'an, and he also gave Li Yuan 1,000 horses. Li Yuan, who wanted Tujue horses more than Tujue soldiers, was pleased and praised Liu for his skills at diplomacy. Khagan's brother Ashina Chiji (阿史那叱吉) was appointed to accompany Tang army to Changan.

Commander of Wuyuan county Zhang Cangxun (张长逊) submitted to Shibi Qaghan in 618 and was created Koli Tegin.

In spring 618, khagan sent his ambassador Kutlug Tegin (骨咄禄特勤) to Tang.

In February 619, khagan was planning a launch a major incursion into Chinese territory and he had Liu Wuzhou to join him. After passing to Xia territory, Liang Shidu also joined him. However, he soon died during campaign near Taiyuan.

Family 
Shibi Khagan was the father of Ashina Shibobi (阿史那什钵苾) and Ashina Jiesheshuai.

References

Citations

Bibliography
 .

Göktürk khagans
7th-century Turkic people
619 deaths
Ashina house of the Turkic Empire
Year of birth unknown
Transition from Sui to Tang